Angharad James (16 July 1677 – 25 August 1749) was a Welsh farmer, harpist and poet.

Life

She was born in Gelliffrydau farm at Baladeulyn in the Nantlle Valley, Wales, on 16 July 1677. When still a young woman, she married William Prichard, a man far older than herself, who farmed Cwm Penamnen, a valley to the south of Dolwyddelan. She lived in Parlwr, or Tai Penamnen, a house which had earlier been a home to the Wynn family of Gwydir, for the remainder of her life. She continued to farm the valley after being widowed. As of 2009, the house was being uncovered by archaeologists.

Death

She was buried on 25 August 1749 and is buried within the church of St. Gwyddelan in Dolwyddelan.

Arts

She was a skilled harpist who commanded her workers to dance to her playing as they returned from the milking.

She is notable as an early Welsh female poet. Due in part to the transcription work of one of James's correspondents, the poet and copyist Margaret Davies, manuscripts of James's work have survived and are held at the National Library of Wales. They include an elegy to her son, who had died when 16, and another to her husband, in the form of an imaginary dialogue.

References

1677 births
1749 deaths
17th-century women musicians
18th-century British women musicians
17th-century Welsh musicians
18th-century Welsh musicians
17th-century Welsh poets
18th-century Welsh poets
17th-century Welsh women writers
18th-century Welsh women writers
People from Gwynedd
Welsh-language poets
Welsh folk harpists
Women harpists
Welsh women musicians
Welsh women poets
Welsh farmers
British women farmers